Lucy Gordon is a pseudonym used by Christine Sparks Fiorotto, a popular British writer of more than 75 romance novels. She began working on a British women's magazine, but since 1984 she has published her romance novels with Silhouette Books and Mills & Boon (or Harlequin Enterprises in the USA).

Biography
Christine Sparks was born in England, Great Britain. Since 1984, Sparks has published novels under the pseudonym Lucy Gordon, and also Penelope Stratton. She has also published under her own name. In 1992 she won a RITA Award for Song of the Lorelei.

Sparks was married to a Venetian artist and they lived in different parts of Italy, though she currently lives in England.

Bibliography

Single novels
Legacy of Fire (1984)
The Judgment of Paris (1984)
Enchantment in Venice (1985)
Island of Dreams (1985)
Cold Hearted Man (1985)
Take All Myself (1985)
Virtue and Vice (1985)
My Only Love, My Only Hate (1986)
Once upon a Time (1986)
Golden Boy (1987)
A Pearl Beyond Price (1987)
A Fragile Beauty (1987)
Just Good Friends (1987)
Eagle's Prey (1987)
A Night of Passion (1988)
A Woman of Spirit (1988)
For Love Alone (1988)
Bought Woman (1989)
Convicted of Love (1989)
Vengeance is Mine (1989)
A True Marriage (1989)
Song of the Lorelei (1990)
The Sicilian (1991)
On His Honor (1991)
Outcast Woman (1992)
Heaven and Earth (1992)
Married in Haste (1993)
Instant Father (1993)
Royal Harlot (1994)
Uncaged (1994)
Seduced by Innocence (1994)
Two-faced Woman (1995)
This Man and This Woman (1995)
For the Love of Emma (1996)
Rebel in Disguise (1996)
This Is My Child (1996)
His Brother's Child (1997)
Beauty and the Boss (1997)
Forgotten Fiancee (1998)
The Diamond Dad (1998)
Be My Girl (1998)
Anything, Any Time, Any Place (1999)
Farelli's Wife (1999)
Tycoon for Hire (1999)
Rico's Secret Child (1999)
Taming Jason (1999)
For the Sake of His Child (2000)
The Sheikh's Reward (2000)
For His Little Girl (2000)
The Stand-In Bride (2001)
A Convenient Wedding (2002)
Princess Dottie (2002)
His Pretend Wife (2002)
The Monte Carlo Proposal (2004)
The Italian's Rightful Bride (2005)
Married Under the Italian Sun (2006)
Italians Wife By Sunset (2007)
The Mediterranean Rebel's Bride (2007)
One Summer in Italy... (2007)
The Italian's Passionate Revenge (2008)
The Italian's Cinderella Bride (2008)

Italian Grooms series
Wife by Arrangement (2001)
Husband by Necessity (2001)
Bride by Choice (2001)

The Counts of Calvani series
The Venetian Playboy's Bride (2003)
The Italian Millionaire's Marriage (2003)
The Tuscan Tycoon's Wife (2003)
Wedding in Venice (2003)
The Counts of Calvani (Omnibus) (2006)

Farnese Brothers series
Rinaldo's Inherited Bride (2004)
Gino's Arranged Bride (2004)

Rinucci Brothers series
Wife and Mother Forever (2005)
Her Italian Boss's Agenda (2005)
The Wedding Arrangement (2006)
The Italian's Wife By Sunset (2007)
The Mediterranean Rebel's Bride (2007)
The Millionaire Tycoon's English Rose (2007)

Simply The Best series
Daniel and Daughter (1997)

Maybe Baby series
The Pregnancy Bond (2002)

Ready for Baby series multi-author
The Italian's Baby (2003)

Heart to Heart series multi-author
A Family for Keeps (2005)

Collections
Kids and Kisses (2000)

Omnibus in collaboration
Blood Brothers (2000) (with Anne McAllister)
Latin Lovers (2000) (with Lynne Graham and Penny Jordan)
Christmas with a Latin Lover (2001) (with Lynne Graham and Penny Jordan)
Making Babies (2001) (with Miranda Lee and Carole Mortimer)
Maybe Baby! (2002) (with Diana Hamilton and Susan Napier)
His Majesty's Marriage (2002) (with Rebecca Winters) (The Prince's Choice / The King's Bride)
Mediterranean Millionaires (2003) (with Lynne Graham and Michelle Reid)
Coming Home for Christmas (2003) (with Helen Bianchin and Rebecca Winters)
Coming Home (2004) (with Helen Bianchin and Rebecca Winters)
Claiming His Mistress (2004) (with Helen Bianchin and Sharon Kendrick)
A Convenient Proposal (2004) (with Helen Bianchin and Kate Walker)
Desert Princes (2007) (with Michelle Reid and Alexandra Sellers)
Whose Baby? (2007) (with Caroline Anderson and Jessica Hart)

Awards
Song of the Lorelei: (1991) RITA Awards Best Novel winner
His Brother's Child: (1998) RITA Awards Best Novel winner

References

External links
Lucy Gordon's Website
Lucy Gordon's Webpage at Harlequin Enterprises Ltd
Lucy Gordon at Fantastic Fiction

Year of birth missing (living people)
Living people
English romantic fiction writers
RITA Award winners
English women novelists
Women romantic fiction writers